Glover House may refer to:

in Japan
Glover Residence, also known as Glover House or Single Pine Tree (Ipponmatsu), in Glover Garden, Nagasaki, Japan

in Scotland
Glover House (Aberdeen, Scotland)

in the United States (by state)
Henry Burt Glover House, Anniston, Alabama, listed on the NRHP in Calhoun County, Alabama
Glover House (Newtown, Connecticut), NRHP-listed
John Glover House, Newtown, Connecticut, NRHP-listed
Glover–McLeod–Garrison House, Marietta, Georgia, listed on the NRHP in Cobb County, Georgia
Clarke–Glover Farmhouse, Southbridge, Massachusetts, NRHP-listed on the NRHP in Massachusetts
Glover House (Quincy, Massachusetts), NRHP-listed
Gen. John Glover House, Marblehead, Massachusetts, NRHP-listed
Glover Cabin, Anaconda, Montana, listed on the NRHP in Deer Lodge County, Montana
Isaac Glover House, Haddon Heights, New Jersey, listed on the NRHP in Camden County, New Jersey
Kurth–Glover House, Lufkin, Texas, listed on the NRHP in Angelina County, Texas
William and Nettie Glover House, Brigham, Utah, listed on the NRHP in Box Elder County, Utah
Glover House (Spokane, Washington), listed on the NRHP in Spokane County, Washington
Ezra Glover Jr. House, New Richmond, Wisconsin, listed on the NRHP in St. Croix County, Wisconsin

See also
Glover Mausoleum, Demopolis, Alabama
Glover School
House Glover, a minor Northern house in the world of A Song of Ice and Fire